A veinticuatro (meaning Twenty-four) or 'Caballero Veintiquatro' (Knight/Gentleman Veintiquatro) was an official in several Andalusian cities in pre-modern Spain, notably Úbeda, Baeza, Jaén, Córdoba, Seville, Jerez de la Frontera and  Granada. The office or post itself was referred to as a veintiquatría. It was largely equivalent to the role of an Alderman, or Councilor, in English local government. It was an office reserved exclusively to those of noble birth- (Hidalgos, of which there were many in Spain), though, like many official positions, the post could  be bought and sold among Hidalgos. Many of the Conquistadors, and the merchants who established the Spanish Empire in America, (for example, the immensely rich Diego Caballero,  were Caballeros Veintiquatro, or bought the post to display the new position in Spanish society the wealth gained in the Americas had allowed them to achieve.

The Veintiquatro name apparently derived from the original number (24) of members of a town council, but this varied with time and from town to town. They had immense privileges their duties were many and various, from deciding and collecting local taxes, to regulating and inspecting markets and shipping and including the relief of poverty and inspecting prisons.

References

Sources
 Real Academía Española  Diccionario de la Lengua Española, 4th Definition of the meaning of Veinticuatro. 
 Veintiquatros of Seville 
 Marichalar, Amalio, et al.  Historia de la legislación y recitaciones del derecho civil de España  Madrid 1862  page 332

Spanish noble titles
Noble titles
 
Conquistador
Spanish words and phrases
Obsolete occupations
History of Andalusia